Cromwell Road is a major London road in the Royal Borough of Kensington and Chelsea, designated as part of the A4. It was created in the 19th century and is said to be named after Richard Cromwell, son of Oliver Cromwell, who once owned a house there.

The Security Service (MI5) was based at 35 Cromwell Road from 1929 to 1934.

Cromwell Road was not always the main traffic route it is now, as when it was built, it ended at Earl's Court. The Cromwell Road extension, across the West London railway line and towards Hammersmith, was authorised as a bridge across the railway in 1884 but completed only in 1941. Thus, it was only after the Second World War that it became the main A4 route into London. The large traffic increase brought much demolition and road rearrangement beyond Earls Court Road in 1967 to 1972, but the main part of Cromwell Road has not had its basic building line changed.

The  road begins as West Cromwell Road, near West Kensington Underground station, and continues eastwards from Talgarth Road. It becomes Cromwell Road proper as it crosses Earl's Court Road.

It goes just south of Cromwell Hospital and then past Gloucester Road and Gloucester Road Underground station. The next major crossroads comes at the intersection with Queen's Gate, on the corner of which stands Baden-Powell House, the former headquarters of The Scout Association. The road then passes to the south of a museum-academic complex, informally known as Albertopolis, including the Natural History Museum, the Science Museum, Imperial College London and the Victoria and Albert Museum, near South Kensington Underground station. Near this complex, at the junction with Exhibition Road, it becomes Cromwell Gardens for a short stretch before it joins Brompton Road. There are two embassies located on the road: the Embassy of Yemen in London at 57 Cromwell Road, opposite the Natural History Museum, and the Embassy of Venezuela. France also maintain several buildings on the road, including the Consular Section of the French embassy.  Ireland maintains a Passport and Visa Section at 114A. The West London Air Terminal (1957–1974) was also located on the road.

See also
 List of eponymous roads in London

References

External links

Streets in the Royal Borough of Kensington and Chelsea
A4 road (England)